David Abraam Julius (Portuguese, David Abraão Júlio) (born 8 January 1932) is a former South African born Portuguese footballer who played as midfielder.

Football career 
He was one of the first two footballers from South Africa to sign with overseas clubs, alongside Steve Mokone who joined Cardiff City.
Júlio gained 4 caps for Portugal and made his debut 27 April 1960 in Ludwigshafen am Rhein against West Germany, in a 1–2 defeat.

Honours
1956-57 Portuguese Cup
1957-58 Primeira Divisão
1961-62 Primeira Divisão
1963-64 UEFA Cup Winners' Cup

External links 
 

1932 births
Living people
Portuguese footballers
Association football midfielders
Primeira Liga players
Sporting CP footballers
Portugal international footballers